Jorge Ulises Orozco (1878-?) was a Mexican diplomat during the Venustiano Carranza presidency. He was the Mexican consul in El Paso, Texas.

References

1878 births
Year of death missing
Mexican diplomats
Mexican expatriates in the United States